Cornelius O'Keeffe; –4 May 1737) was an Irish Roman Catholic prelate who served as the Bishop of Limerick from 1720 to 1737.

Biography
O'Keeffe's family had been expelled from their property at Glanville during the 1650s, eventually settling at Drumkeene, County Limerick, where he was born. His parents were Honor O'Daly and "Dionysii" O'Keeffe, and he was the youngest of six boys. The family descendants were in Templeglantine until the 1950s' and claimed The Fermoy O'Keeffe Chieftains connection right up to the end.

He received the tonsure at the hands of the Archbishop of Bordeaux on 29 March 1686, having studied at Bruges or Toulouse, or both.

He was listed as an Irish exile in Brittany in 1710, when he was nominated for the rectorship of St. Similien's parish, Nantes. In common with all Irish bishops of his day he was nominated by James III.

The O'Keeffe Chalice, dating from about 1735, was made for him. He was succeeded by Robert Lacy.

References

External links
 https://archive.org/stream/irishecclesiast04unkngoog#page/n360/mode/2up
 https://web.archive.org/web/20120203225516/http://oce.catholic.com/index.php?title=Irish_Colleges_on_the_Continent
 https://web.archive.org/web/20120426011445/http://www.okeefeclan.org/main/index.php?option=com_content&view=article&id=586%3Aokeeffe-chalices&catid=29%3Aancient&Itemid=59

1670s births
1737 deaths
18th-century Roman Catholic bishops in Ireland
Roman Catholic bishops of Limerick